"Mamma Knows Best" is a song by English singer-songwriter Jessie J, from her debut studio album Who You Are. It was written and produced by Jessie J (credited Jessica Cornish) and Ashton Thomas, and peaked at number 59 on the UK Singles Chart.

Background and composition

The song was written by Jessie J, Ashton Thomas and produced by same. This big-band work-out was one of the first songs written by Jessie J and the first one that brought her to people's attention.

Reception

Critical response
"Mamma Knows Best" received generally positive reviews from critics. Mike Diver from BBC, said: "Mamma Knows Best" brings a big-band-trapped-in-a-synthesizer sound to the fore, more Pixie Lott than Ain't No Other Man-period Christina Aguilera.

Chart performance
In the United Kingdom, "Mamma Knows Best" debuted on the UK Singles Chart at number 59 on 7 April 2012 for one week.

Live performances
Jessie J performed the song on Britain's Got Talent in 2011. Jessie J performed "Mamma Knows Best" live from Don Hill's in NYC as part of VEVO's LIFT showcase. On 13 March 2011 she performed the song on Saturday Night Live. On 3 June 2011 hit the stage on Britain's Got Talent. On 12 April, Jessie J performed the song at BET's., and on 13 March 2011 she performed it at MTV Push. A homemade video posted by Jessie on her account on YouTube helped promote it.

Credits and personnel
 Songwriting – Jessie J, Ashton Thomas
 Production – Ashton Thomas
 Vocals – Jessie J

Credits adapted from the album's liner notes.

Charts

References

2012 songs
Jessie J songs
Songs written by Jessie J